Sebastian Bayer (born 11 June 1986 in Aachen, West Germany) is a German long jumper best known for having history's second longest indoor long jump.

Biography
He won the silver medal at the 2005 European Junior Championships. He also competed at the 2006 European Championships and the 2008 Olympic Games without reaching the final.

On 8 March 2009 at the European Indoor Track and Field Championships in Torino, Italy, Bayer long jumped  to win the gold medal. This is the second longest indoor long jump in history, behind Carl Lewis’  world indoor record set on 27 January 1984 at the Millrose Games in New York City, NY. His result is the best by any German, as it is further than the German national outdoor record of  set at the 1980 Summer Olympic games in Moscow by Lutz Dombrowski.

Competition record

Personal bests

Key:  ER = European record, NR = National record

Last updated 15 September 2010.

See also
List of European records in athletics

References

External links

1986 births
Living people
Sportspeople from Aachen
German male long jumpers
German national athletics champions
Olympic athletes of Germany
Athletes (track and field) at the 2008 Summer Olympics
Athletes (track and field) at the 2012 Summer Olympics
World Athletics Championships athletes for Germany
European Athletics Championships medalists